Ptocheuusa dresnayella is a moth of the family Gelechiidae. It was described by Daniel Lucas in 1945. It is found in Tunisia.

References

Moths described in 1945
Ptocheuusa